The XVIII Constitutional Government of Portugal had José Sócrates (PS) as the prime minister and lasted from 26 October 2009  to 21 June 2011.

Composition

Events 
In 2008–09, with the Great Recession starting to hit Portugal and facing recession and high unemployment, austerity was waned as part of the European economic stimulus plan. Nevertheless, support for Sócrates and the Socialists eroded and the ruling party lost its majority in the 2009 election. The second government of José Sócrates faced a deterioration of the economic and financial state of the country, with skyrocketing deficit and growing debt. Austerity was resumed in 2010 while the country entered a hard financial crisis in the context of the European debt crisis.

On 23 March 2011, Sócrates submitted his resignation to President Aníbal Cavaco Silva after the Parliament rejected a new austerity package (the fourth in a year), leading to the 2011 snap election. Financial status of the country deteriorated and on 6 April Sócrates caretaker government requested a bail-out program which was conceded. The €78 billion IMF/European Union bailout to Portugal thus started and would last until May 2014. Sócrates lost the snap election held on 5 June 2011 and resigned as Secretary-General of the Socialist Party. For most of his political career, Sócrates was associated to several corruption cases, notably Independente University and Freeport cases.

References 

2009 establishments in Portugal
2011 disestablishments in Portugal
Cabinets established in 2009
Cabinets disestablished in 2011
Constitutional Governments of Portugal